

Schools named "Terry Fox Elementary School"

 Terry Fox Elementary School (Abbotsford, BC)
 Terry Fox Elementary School (Barrie, ON)
 Terry Fox Elementary (Pierrefonds, QC)
 Terry Fox Elementary School (Bathurst, New Brunswick)